Charlie Bray may refer to:

Charlie Bray (cricketer) (1898–1993), English cricketer
Charlie Bray (Canadian football) (born 1945), Canadian football player

See also
Charles Bray (1811–1884), British ribbon manufacturer, social reformer and phrenologist
Charles Bray (glass artist) (1922–2012), British painter and glass sculptor